Kritinia (Greek: Κρητηνία) is a Greek village in the municipal unit of Attavyros, on the island of Rhodes, South Aegean region. In 2011 its population was 503; 454 in the village proper and 49 in the locality of Kameiros Skala.

History
The village, meaning New Crete, was founded by some families escaped from Crete (Κρήτη) during the Turkish rule in the island. Originally, the settlement was located by the coast, in the current position of Kameiros Skala; but after the Byzantine era it was moved on the hills, for safety against pirates. In 1658, the Venetian Doge Francesco Morosini tried to conquer Rhodes entering at Kameiros Skala beach, but the Venetian army was rejected.

The castle above Kritinia, named Kastellos (Κάστελλος), was built in 1472 by Giorgio Orsini to protect the inhabitants of the village from the attacks of the Ottoman fleets. Until the liberation of the Dodecanese, the village was named Kastelli, from the Latin Castellum, meaning castle.

Geography
Kritinia is located on a hillside between Mount Attavyros and the western coast of the island of Rhodes. It is 10 km from Embonas, 51 km from the town of Rhodes, 53 km from Lindos and 35 km from Rhodes International Airport.

The locality of Kameiros Skala is located by the Aegean Sea, 5 km from Kritinia. It has a beach and a little port with a ferry service to the island of Halki. Despite the name Kameiros Skala is some 14 km from Kameiros.  Close to it is Mandriko, a locality which is part of the community of Embonas.

Gallery

References

External links

 Kritinia official website

Populated places in Rhodes